The 1918 Kentucky Wildcats football team represented the University of Kentucky as an independent during the 1918 college football season. Led by first-year head coach Thomas Andrew Gill, the Wildcats compiled a record of 2–1.

Schedule

References

Kentucky
Kentucky Wildcats football seasons
Kentucky Wildcats football